Schalls is an unincorporated community in Union Township in Perry County, Missouri, United States.
Schalls is situated in the north-central corner of Perry County. A post office was maintained from 1886 through 1910. The community was named after Maritz Schall, a pioneer stock dealer and farmer.

References 

Unincorporated communities in Perry County, Missouri
Unincorporated communities in Missouri